Soul houses were pottery offering trays often moulded to include a model of a house that are associated with tombs dating from the Middle Kingdom of Egypt. Designs range from simple trays with no house at all to ones which included a comprehensive model of a house. As well as the house there would be clay depictions of food offerings. Some have spouts allowing liquid to be ritually poured over the soul house and flow away. 

It has been suggested they were used to mark the tomb on the surface. Another suggestion was that the house was meant to be a place for the dead person’s ka to live although this theory has become less popular over time with the modern view being that the trays were primarily meant to provide food offerings or rather clay models of them.

The model houses have been used as a source for what typical houses of the time would have looked like.

References

Ancient Egyptian funerary practices